The Bahrain Women's Football League called BFA Women's Football League is the top flight of women's association football in Bahrain. The competition is run by the Bahrain Football Association.

History
The first Bahrain Women's League was contested in the 2004–05 season. Matches are played at the BFA Headquarters next to the Bahrain National Stadium.

Champions
The list of champions and runners-up:

Most successful clubs

References

External links 
 Women's Football - BFA Official Website

Top level women's association football leagues in Asia
Football competitions in Bahrain
Women
2004 establishments in Bahrain
Sports leagues established in 2004